Isaiah Anderson (born December 19, 1989) is a former American football wide receiver. He played college football at the Oklahoma State University.

College career
After redshirting in 2008, Anderson played for the Oklahoma State Cowboys football team from 2009 to 2012. After missing most of the 2012 season due an injury to his hand, Anderson had three touchdown passes of 60, 33 and 66 yards, and compiled a career-high 174 receiving yards in a 59–21 victory over Texas Tech on November 17, 2012.

Professional career
On November 26, 2013, Anderson was signed by the Oklahoma Defenders of the Champions Professional Indoor Football League for their upcoming season set to commence in March, 2014.

Personal life
Anderson majored in secondary education at Oklahoma State University. Anderson is the father of two sons.

References

External links
Oklahoma State Cowboys bio 
NFL Draft Scout profile

1989 births
Living people
Oklahoma State Cowboys football players
Oklahoma Defenders players
American football wide receivers
People from Wichita Falls, Texas